Stéphane Lambese (born 10 May 1995) is a professional footballer who plays as a right back. Born in France, he represents Haiti internationally.

Club career
Born in Nogent-sur-Marne, France, Lambese began his career in 2004 with Olympique de Sevran, before moving in the summer of 2009 to the youth of Paris Saint-Germain. In the summer of 2012, he moved from the youth in the reserve of PSG. He signed his first professional contract with the club in the summer of 2015, but left the club at the end of the 2015–16 season.

In January 2017 Lambese signed a short term contract with Blois Football 41 in Championnat National 3. At the end of the season he signed a one-year contract with Lorient B. After training several times with the senior team, he signed a professional contract with Lorient in May 2018.

He moved on loan from Lorient to Stade Lavallois in July 2018. After a successful season, he signed for Ligue 2 side Orléans in May 2019, agreeing a three-year contract. He made his debut at the professional level in the first game of the 2019–20 Ligue 2 season on 26 July 2019, a 0–0 draw against Nancy.

On 29 July 2021, he signed with Ligue 2 club Quevilly-Rouen.

International career
Lambese represented 2010 in four international for the French U-16 football team. Since 2014, he represents the national team of Haiti, he is part of the U-20 national team. Lambese participated in an unofficial friendly match against the Kosovo national team on 7 March 2014.

Lambese was part of the Haiti squad for the Copa América Centenario in 2016.

References

External links
 
 
 
 Stéphane Lambese  at FHF
 
 

1995 births
Living people
Association football defenders
French footballers
Haitian footballers
Paris Saint-Germain F.C. players
Blois Football 41 players
FC Lorient players
Stade Lavallois players
US Orléans players
US Quevilly-Rouen Métropole players
Ligue 2 players
Championnat National players
Championnat National 2 players
Championnat National 3 players
France youth international footballers
Haiti international footballers
2015 CONCACAF U-20 Championship players
Copa América Centenario players
2021 CONCACAF Gold Cup players
French sportspeople of Haitian descent
Citizens of Haiti through descent